Philautus bunitus is a species of frog in the family Rhacophoridae.
It is endemic to Malaysian Borneo and inhabits subtropical or tropical moist lowland forests and subtropical or tropical moist montane forests and is threatened by habitat loss.

Description
Relatively large sized adults (SVL of male: up to 41 mm; female up to 46 mm). Stocky in habit. Finger tips with rounded  discs. Webbing in the base of fingers rudimentary. Supratympanic fold distinct. Hind feet with moderate webbing. Toe tips with dilated discs. Skin sparsely granular on dorsum. Small spinular projections on upper eyelids. Ventral side granular. Coloration variable. Generally green with black spots or stripes. Venter uniformly lemon yellow turning bright orange towards the vent. Iris brownish with black vermiculations. Inner and outer sides of thigh and tarsus bright orange.

Distribution, natural history and ecology
It occurs in Mount Kinabalu in western Sabah. It is restricted to elevations of 1000 to 1900 m amsl. It has the habit of being restricted to understorey vegetation.

References

Amphibians of Malaysia
Endemic fauna of Malaysia
bunitus
Amphibians described in 1995
Taxonomy articles created by Polbot